International College may refer to:

 International College, Beirut, Lebanon
 International College, Los Angeles, United States
 International College, Stockholm, Sweden
 London International College
 International College (Mauritius)
 Hodges University (formerly known as International College), Naples, Florida